Journal of Biological Inorganic Chemistry is a peer-reviewed scientific journal. It is an official publication of the Society of Biological Inorganic Chemistry and published by Springer Science+Business Media.

Subjects covered 
Areas of research covered in the journal include: advances in the understanding of systems involving one or more metal ions set in a biological matrix - particularly metalloproteins and metal-nucleic acid complexes - in order to understand biological function at the molecular level. Synthetic analogues mimicking function, structure and spectroscopy of naturally occurring biological molecules are also covered. Original articles, mini-reviews and commentaries on debated issues are being published.

The journal is abstracted/indexed in Chemical Abstracts Service, Current Contents/Life Sciences, PubMed/MEDLINE, and the Science Citation Index.

Indexed by ISI Journal of Biological Inorganic Chemistry received an impact factor of 2.538 as reported in the 2014 Journal Citation Reports by Thomson Reuters, ranking it 157 out of 289 journals in the category Biochemistry & Molecular Biology and ranking it 9th out of 44 journals in the category Chemistry, Inorganic & Nuclear.

Editor in chief 
The current editor in chief is Lawrence Que (University of Minnesota) and Ivano Bertini was the founding editor.

References 

English-language journals
Inorganic chemistry journals
Biochemistry journals
Springer Science+Business Media academic journals
Publications established in 1996